The United States District Court for the District of Massachusetts (in case citations, D. Mass.) is the federal district court whose territorial jurisdiction is the Commonwealth of Massachusetts, United States.  The first court session was held in Boston in 1789.  The second term was held in Salem in 1790 and court session locations alternated between the two cities until 1813.  That year, Boston became the court's permanent home. A western division was opened in Springfield in 1979 and a central division was opened in Worcester in 1987.  The court's main building is the John Joseph Moakley Federal Courthouse on Fan Pier in South Boston.

Appeals from the District of Massachusetts are heard by the United States Court of Appeals for the First Circuit, also located in the Moakley courthouse (except for patent claims and claims against the U.S. government under the Tucker Act, which are appealed to the Federal Circuit).

Jurisdiction 
The District of Massachusetts has three court divisions:

The Eastern Division, covering Barnstable, Bristol, Dukes, Essex, Middlesex, Nantucket, Norfolk, Plymouth, and Suffolk counties. Cases filed in the Eastern Division are heard in Boston.

The Central Division, covering Worcester county. Cases filed in the Central Division are heard in Worcester.

The Western Division, covering Berkshire, Franklin, Hampden, and Hampshire counties. Cases filed in the Western Division are heard in Springfield.

U.S. Attorney's Office

The United States Attorney's Office for the District of Massachusetts represents the United States in civil and criminal litigation in the court.  the  Senate-confirmed U.S. Attorney is Rachael Rollins.

Federal Public Defender's Office
The Federal Public Defender's Office represents individuals who cannot afford to hire a lawyer in federal criminal cases and related matters. The office is assigned to cases by the district courts in three districts (New Hampshire, Rhode Island, and Massachusetts), and by the U.S. Court of Appeals for the First Circuit.

Current judges
:

Vacancies and pending nominations

Former judges

Chief judges

Succession of seats

List of U.S. Attorneys

Notable cases

Ghen v. Rich (1881) (a whale is the property of the whaler who killed it, and not the person who found it dead on the beach).
2019 college admissions bribery scandal (2019)

See also
 Courts of Massachusetts
 Judiciary of Massachusetts
 List of current United States district judges
 List of United States federal courthouses in Massachusetts
 United States Court of Appeals for the First Circuit

References

External links
United States District Court for the District of Massachusetts Official Website
United States Attorney for the District of Massachusetts Official Website
United States Marshal for the District of Massachusetts Official Website

 
Massachusetts
Massachusetts law
Government of Boston
Salem, Massachusetts
Springfield, Massachusetts
Worcester, Massachusetts
1789 establishments in Massachusetts
Courthouses in Massachusetts
Courts and tribunals established in 1789